The canebrake groundcreeper (Clibanornis dendrocolaptoides) is a species of bird in the family Furnariidae.

It is found in southeastern Brazil, eastern Paraguay and far northeastern Argentina. Its natural habitat is subtropical or tropical moist lowland forest. It is becoming rare due to habitat loss.

References

canebrake groundcreeper
Birds of the Atlantic Forest
canebrake groundcreeper
canebrake groundcreeper
Taxonomy articles created by Polbot